Loma is an unincorporated town, post office, and census-designated place (CDP) located in and governed by Mesa County, Colorado, United States. It is part of the Grand Junction, CO Metropolitan Statistical Area. The Loma post office has the ZIP Code 81524. At the 2020 census, the population of the Loma CDP was 1,293.

History
The name "Loma" is derived from a Spanish word meaning "small hill".

The area was first inhabited by the Ute people, who had left by 1881.

In 1882, the Denver and Rio Grande Western Railroad completed a narrow-gauge railroad through Loma.  A standard-gauge track was installed in 1890.

Homesteaders began arriving in Loma in the late 1880s. Agriculture became a dominant feature in Loma's early economy, enabled by the completion of the Kiefer Extension irrigation canal in 1899. The railway provided easy shipment of crops and livestock to larger cities like Denver and Salt Lake City.

The first school was established in the 1890s, and the two-story Loma School was constructed in 1910 from yellow brick, fired on the grounds. The brick school remained in use until 1982, when Loma Elementary School opened.

In 1901, the Colorado Sugar Company opened  of land near Loma to settlers. Sugar beets were a primary crop, and beet production dominated Loma's agriculture until the 1970s, when the Delta Sugar Beet factory closed.  Potatoes were also grown by Loma farmers.

The Loma post office opened in 1905, and has continued in operation since.

In 1910, the church now known as Loma Community Church was built. It has often been referred to as "The Church That Stayed".  Virginia Donoho produced a 15,000 word history of the church by that same name in the early 1980s. In 1965 the building added indoor plumbing, a fellowship hall, a kitchen, and two bathrooms. In the late 1970s a small addition was built.

Reed intended on growing apples, and installed an underground irrigation system to water his orchards. In 1911, the Loma Canning and Preserving Company opened a canning factory in Loma to process the anticipated harvests. The endeavor was not a success, and the factory closed a few years later without ever reaching its capacity. Reed sold the Golden Hills Ranch in 1923.

A second irrigation canal called the Highline Canal was built through Loma in 1917, and led to significant economic growth and several bumper crops during the 1920s.

By 1923, Loma had a school, blacksmith, garage, railroad station, school, two-story hotel, shipping yard, post office, pool hall, two churches, two grocery stores, and many two-story homes.

During the Depression, the federal government relocated 32 families from the Dust Bowl to Loma.

A "reading room" was established in Loma in 1936 as part of an effort to provide rural citizens in Mesa County with free public library service.  In 1938, the Loma Community Hall was erected, and was used for community meetings and social events. The hall was added to the National Register of Historic Places in 1995.

A uranium mine and mill were built near Loma in the 1940s. Small settlements such as Loma with uranium mines were called "yellowcake towns" because the uranium oxide they produced resembled cake mix.

In the 1950s, a pipeline was constructed along an abandoned Uintah Railway track to carry a mixture of crushed gilsonite ore and water from Bonanza, Utah, to Loma. The American Gilsonite Company owned the slurry line and built a plant in Loma, where the gilsonite was refined into gasoline, "gilsapave" paving tar, and briquettes used for aluminum refining.  The plant was later purchased by Gary Refining.

In July 2015, the Colorado Department of Transportation installed Loma's first signal light at the intersection of Highway 139 and Route 6.

Country Jam is a country music and camping festival in nearby Mack that has taken place since 1992.

Geography
U.S. Route 6 passes through the center of town, leading northwest  to Mack and southeast  to Fruita. Interstate 70 forms the southern edge of the Loma CDP, with access from Exit 15 (Colorado State Highway 139). Highway 139 leads north from Loma over Douglas Pass  to Rangely. The Colorado River flows south of Loma.

Loma has been described as having:
A sense of openness that is created by farmsteads, viable agriculture, farm based businesses, small subdivisions, mixed housing types and lot sizes, single-lane farm roads, and two core villages [Loma and Mack] that are the focal points of the surrounding landscape.  The underpinnings of rural character is supported by this self chosen lifestyle of small town values, family, community, independence, responsibility, conservation, entrepreneurship, and a strong work ethic.

Demographics

Economy
The current agricultural base of the Loma area consists mainly of small-scale cattle operations, row crop cultivation, and lifestyle agriculture.

Parks and recreation

There is significant publicly owned land in and around Loma, managed primarily by the Bureau of Land Management. The Loma Boat Launch State Wildlife Area, located south of Loma, is a popular access point to the Colorado River for recreation activities.  The trailhead of the Kokopelli Trail, a  recreation trail, is located southwest of Loma.  The trail passes through the  McInnis Canyons National Conservation Area south of Loma.

Education
Education is provided by the Mesa County Valley School District 51.

Loma Elementary School is located in Loma. Its mascot is the lion, and school colors are green and white.  After elementary school, Loma students attend Fruita Middle School and Fruita Monument High School in Fruita.

Media
KCDC radio station is located in Loma.

Infrastructure
Law Enforcement is provided by the Mesa County Sheriff and the Colorado State Patrol.  Fire protection is provided by the Lower Valley Volunteer Fire District, which has a station in Loma.

Notable people
 James Niehues, panoramic illustrator known for his ski area trail maps
 Eunice Parsons, artist

See also

Outline of Colorado
Index of Colorado-related articles
State of Colorado
Colorado cities and towns
Colorado census designated places
Colorado counties
Mesa County, Colorado
Colorado metropolitan areas
Grand Junction, CO Metropolitan Statistical Area

References

External links

Loma @ UncoverColorado.com
Mesa County website

Census-designated places in Mesa County, Colorado
Census-designated places in Colorado